The  is a Japanese freight-only railway line from Izumi, serving Onahama Freight Terminal, all in Iwaki, Fukushima. The third sector company had its roots as a horsecar operator, opened in 1907 to transport salt and fish. On the development of the Port of Onahama industrial area it changed to a railway line carrying zinc and containers. It had a passenger service until 1972.

Basic data
Distance: 5.4 km / 3.4 mi.
Gauge: 
Double track line: None
Electrification: None
Railway signalling: Tablet token

History
The Onahama Horse tram opened a 762mm gauge line 5 km to its namesake town in 1907, and extended the line a further 5 km to Ena in 1916. The Onahama - Ena section closed in 1936, the company renamed itself the Onahama Port Railway in 1939, and converted the line to 1067mm gauge in 1941. The Ena Railway Co. rebuilt the Onahama - Ena section as 1067mm gauge in 1953. In 1965 a typhoon caused the collapse of a retaining wall, and the Onahama - Ena section formally closed in 1967. The passenger service on the Izumi - Onahama section ceased in 1972.

Stations

See also
List of railway companies in Japan
List of railway lines in Japan

References
This article incorporates material from the corresponding article in the Japanese Wikipedia

External links
  

Railway lines in Japan
Rail transport in Fukushima Prefecture
Railway lines opened in 1907
1067 mm gauge railways in Japan